The First Grammar School of Kragujevac is a high school located in Kragujevac, Serbia. Founded in 1833, the school is the oldest Serbian high school south of the Sava - Danube line.

Studying profiles
The school comprises three educational tracks:
 Scientific (chemistry, math, physics, biology)
 Social Studies and Language (history, Serbian, Latin, German, English, French)
 Mathematics - Special (for gifted students - Mathematics and Informatics)

Notable alumni
Radoje Domanović
Jovan Ristić
Gorica Popović
Jelena Tomašević
Marija Šerifović
Aleksandar Gigović

External links
 The First Grammar School of Kragujevac official website

Gymnasiums in Serbia
Education in Kragujevac
Educational institutions established in 1833
Buildings and structures in Kragujevac
1833 establishments in the Ottoman Empire